Maszewo is a town in West Pomeranian Voivodeship (north-west Poland).

Maszewo may also refer to:

Maszewo, Gorzów County in Lubusz Voivodeship (west Poland)
Maszewo, Masovian Voivodeship (east-central Poland)
Maszewo, Krosno Odrzańskie County in Lubusz Voivodeship (west Poland)